Hardwick Field , also known as Cleveland Municipal Airport, was a public airport located four miles (6 km) northeast of the central business district of Cleveland, in Bradley County, Tennessee, United States. It opened in 1955 and was owned by the City of Cleveland.

Although most U.S. airports used the same three-letter location identifier for the FAA and IATA, Hardwick Field was assigned HDI by the FAA but had no designation from the IATA.

Cleveland Regional Jetport opened on January 25, 2013, approximately two miles east of Hardwick Field, and consists of a 6,200 foot by 100 foot runway. It was created to replace Hardwick Field, which closed on December 31, 2013.

Facilities and aircraft 

For the 12-month period ending March 4, 1999, the airport had 12,197 aircraft operations, an average of 33 per day: 93% general aviation, 7% air taxi and <1% military. There were 40 aircraft based at this airport: 60% single-engine, 38% multi-engine and 3% jet.

References

External links 

Airports in Tennessee
Buildings and structures in Bradley County, Tennessee
Transportation in Bradley County, Tennessee
Cleveland, Tennessee
Airports established in 1955
Defunct airports in Tennessee
2013 disestablishments in Tennessee
1955 establishments in Tennessee
Airports disestablished in 2013